Erpe-Mere United is a Belgian association football club based in Bambrugge, East Flanders. The club has matricule number 5343 and the club's colours are black and yellow. They currently play in East Flanders Division One in the Belgian Provincial leagues. They play their home games at the Complex Lindekouter in Bambrugge.

History 
The club was founded on 16 August 1949 as RC Bambrugge and joined the Royal Belgian Football Association on 24 June 1950, with matricule number 5343 being assigned to the team. Bambrugge played for decades in the provisional leagues, but climbed steadily, and remained at the top of the Second Provincial division for years. They were the winners of their series in 2009, resulting in promotion to the highest provincial level, the first club ever from Erpe-Mere to achieve this.

Merger plans 
During the 2010s, plans were made for the four remaining clubs from Erpe-Mere (SK Aaigem, KRC Bambrugge, KFC Olympic Burst and FC Mere) to merge. Eventually, in 2021 KRC Bambrugge and FC Mere merged to form Erpe-Mere United from the 2021–2022 season on, with Aaigem and Burst still to be integrated later on.

References

External links 
 Official Website 

Football clubs in Belgium
Erpe-Mere
1949 establishments in Belgium
Association football clubs established in 1949